Éva Brájer (born 1962) is a Hungarian politician, member of the National Assembly (MP) from Fejér County Regional List between 2010 and 2014. She was a member of the Committee on Education, Science and Research from 14 May 2010 to 5 May 2014.

References

1962 births
Living people
People from Székesfehérvár
Fidesz politicians
Members of the National Assembly of Hungary (2010–2014)
Women members of the National Assembly of Hungary
21st-century Hungarian women politicians